Chanakya is a 2019 Indian Telugu-language  spy action thriller film directed by Thiru and produced by Rama Brahmam Sunkara under AK Entertainments banner. The film features Gopichand, Zareen Khan and Mehreen Pirzada in the lead roles, is marking Thiru's Telugu debut as director and Khan's acting debut in Telugu films, it also stars Nassar, Rajesh Khattar, Upen Patel, Sunil,  Jayaprakash, Raja Chembolu and Adarsh Balakrishna in the supporting roles. The film marks the second collaboration between Gopichand & Mehreen after Pantham.  The music of the film is composed by Vishal Chandrasekhar and Sricharan Pakala.

The film follows an undercover agent named Arjun, who races against time to rescue his teammates after they are kidnapped by a Pakistani terrorist named Sohail. Disavowed by his own agency after his cover gets blown, he sets out on the rescue operation in Karachi and enlists the help of another RAW agent Zubeida to accomplish the mission.

Chanakya was released theatrically on 5 October 2019.

Plot
In order to catch Abdul Salim, the right hand of India's most wanted terrorist Ibrahim Qureshi, the RAW chief Kulkarni recruits agent Arjun and his team. Once Salim arrives at the spot, Arjun and his teammates eliminate all the guards and manage to take Salim in their custody. In the meanwhile, Arjun resumes his life as a banker named Ramakrishna and learns from Kulkarni that Salim would be shifted to prison as per the orders. Arjun warns him not to do so, fearing that there might be an attempt to rescue him. Nevertheless, Salim is dispatched in a police van accompanied by other vehicles. However, masked shooters from a chopper attack the cars and free Salim. Once he boards the chopper, the attackers are revealed to be Arjun and his teammates. Feeling Salim is not needed since his existence would be a threat to the nation's security, Arjun shoots him.

Later, when Arjun is on a date with his girlfriend Aishwarya, he is attacked by some goons, and a fight ensues, resulting in Arjun learning about the capture of his teammates. The kidnapper is none other than Sohail, the son of Ibrahim Qureshi's. He challenges Arjun to come to Karachi and rescue his teammates, due to which Arjun seeks the help from his agency but is disavowed due to his cover getting blown. He uses his own resources to get himself into Pakistan, where he meets a RAW agent named Zubeida. Together, they plant CCTV cameras on Sohail's route to learn of his destination. Realizing that there is no signal whenever his vehicles pass, Arjun believes the traffic police commissioner to be getting information about Sohail's destination. Zubeida gets the commissioner engaged at a bar and helps Arjun digitally acquire the officer's fingerprints and voice activation to unlock his laptop. The officer learns of someone sneaking in and rushes back but in vain.

Arjun and Zubeida learn that Sohail is going to attend a function at a hotel and plan to kidnap him. When all their plans fail, Arjun shows up and manages to kidnap Sohail. However, at their secret location, Arjun and Zubeida realize that they have kidnapped Sohail's body double instead of Sohail himself. An enraged Arjun shoots him, and seeing Qureshi's henchmen coming for him, runs away, attacking them. In the ensuing chase, Arjun gets shot, while Ibrahim declares a manhunt for Arjun, who manages to hide and is eventually rescued by Zubeida. Sohail manages to retrieve the CCTV cameras set up by Zubeida and kills Arjun's friend on the camera. However, Arjun tells Zubeida to rewind the footage and learns that his friend had sent him a message through Morse code. They learn that Sohail is planning to flee Arjun's teammates and get the G8 Summit attacked so that they can frame India by showing the footage of Arjun and his teammates in Karachi. This would be seen as India's attempt to disgrace Pakistan, and India would, in turn, be disgraced. In order to stop this and continue Mission Chanakya, Arjun reunites Kulkarni, who is then revealed to have told him to meet Zubeida. Using the information from other RAW agents in Karachi, Arjun manages to trace Sohail's location and beats him up. He then makes a deal with Ibrahim to arrive at the border with Arjun's teammates in exchange for Sohail's life. Once the deal is done, Ibrahim realizes that Arjun gave him Sohail's body double, who was not killed by the shooting and saved on time. With Sohail now in Indian custody, Ibrahim challenges to free him but is instead himself handed over to India. Arjun is congratulated by the RAW before he shoots the mole dead in front of his officers.

Cast

Gopichand as Arjun Srikar, an undercover RAW agent alias 'Bank' Ramakrishna, a bank officer
Zareen Khan as Zubeida Khan, RAW Agent in Karachi
Mehreen Pirzada as Aishwarya, the bank's most important customer and Arjun's love interest
Nassar as Kulkarni, chief of RAW
Rajesh Khattar as Ibrahim Qureshi, a Pakistan-based terrorist
Upen Patel as Sohail Ibrahim Qureshi, Qureshi's son / Body Double
Sunil as Seenu, Bank Employee
Jayaprakash as Central Home Minister
Mir Sarwar as Abdul Salem, Qureshi's right-hand
Adarsh Balakrishna as Aadi, Raw agent and Arjun's teammate
Manush, RAW Agent and Arjun's teammate
Raja Chembolu as Ravinder, RAW Agent and Arjun's teammate
Swapnika as Aishwarya's friend
Revathi as Ravinder's wife
Karuna Bhushan as Aadi's wife
Vineet Kumar as Karachi Transport Commissioner Mohammed Ali Khan
Raghu Babu as Bank Manager
Ali as Dr. Ali (Cameo)
Bharath Reddy as Home Minister's PA, the mole from India

Production 
Gopichand launched his 26th project titled Chanakya in February 2019 with Tamil director Thiru, marking his Telugu debut as director and Mehreen Pirzada as leading lady. The filming began in the same month with shooting at Jaipur. Zareen Khan was cast to play a vital role in the film, marking her debut in Telugu films.

Soundtrack 

The soundtrack composed by Vishal Chandrasekhar, Sricharan Pakala and lyrics by Ramajogayya Sastry.

Release 
Chanakya was theatrically released worldwide on 5 October 2019. The film was also dubbed and released in Hindi on television and YouTube by Wide Angle Media Pvt. Ltd. on 27 December 2020.The film was also dubbed in Malayalam as Agent Chanakya was released in 2020.

Reception

Critical response 
The Hans India gave the 2.5 stars out of 5 stating, "'Chanakya' is a well-treated story that is presented in an interesting way".

Neeshita Nyayapati writing for The Times of India gave the 2 stars out of 5, stating that "Chanakya is a meandering drama that seems confused about whether it wants to be a spy-thriller that takes itself way too seriously or a commercial drama that has a little bit of everything".

Hemanth Kumar writing for Firstpost gave the 2 stars out of 5, stating, "When a spy drama is treated as a masala movie where characters openly challenge each other, you know it has landed in a quagmire. And we are sucked into it too".

References

External links

2019 films
2010s Telugu-language films
2019 action thriller films
2010s spy thriller films
Indian spy thriller films
Indian action thriller films
Films scored by Vishal Chandrasekhar
Films scored by Sricharan Pakala